Azanialobus is a monotypic genus of South African araneomorph spiders in the family Orsolobidae containing the single species, Azanialobus lawrencei. It was first described by C. E. Griswold & Norman I. Platnick in 1987, and is only found in South Africa.

See also
 List of Orsolobidae species

References

Endemic fauna of South Africa
Monotypic Araneomorphae genera
Orsolobidae
Spiders of South Africa